Conte cabinet may refer to:

 Conte I Cabinet
 Conte II Cabinet